Last of the Summer Wine's seventh series originally aired on BBC1 between 25 December 1982 and 27 December 1983. All episodes from this series were written by Roy Clarke and produced and directed by Sydney Lotterby, except for "Getting Sam Home", which is produced and directed by Alan J.W. Bell.

The seventh series was released on DVD in region 2 as a combined box set with series 8 on 3 March 2008.

Outline
The trio in this series consisted of:

First appearances

PC Cooper (1983, 1988–2010)

Last appearances

Sid (1973–1983)

List of episodes
Christmas Special (1982)

Regular series

Christmas Special (1983)

DVD release
The box set for series 7 and 8 was released by Universal Playback in March 2008.

Notes

References

External links
Series 7 at the Internet Movie Database

Last of the Summer Wine series
1983 British television seasons
1982 British television seasons